ATR-132 was laid down on 12 October 1944 at the Gulfport Boiler & Welding Works, Port Arthur, Texas; launched on 26 November 1944; and commissioned on 30 January 1945.

In 1945, ATR-132 was redesignated as Ocean tug, auxiliary, ATA-205. She was placed in reserve, out of commission, and assigned to the United States Pacific Reserve Fleet and berthed on the Columbia River in January 1947. ATA-205 was named Sciota on 16 July 1948. In November 1960, Sciota was transferred to the Maritime Administration for custody, but the Navy retained ownership. Sciota's name was struck from the Navy list on 1 September 1962.

See also
 Type V ship

References
 
 Online: Service Ship Photo Archive USS Sciota (ATA-205)

 

1944 ships
Ships built in Port Arthur, Texas
Sotoyomo-class tugs